Marina Kroschina defeated Sue Minford in the final, 6–4, 6–4 to win the girls' singles tennis title at the 1971 Wimbledon Championships.

Draw

Finals

Top half

Bottom half

References

External links

Girls' Singles
Wimbledon Championship by year – Girls' singles
Girls